Jamie Douglas (born 4 July 1992) is a Northern Irish professional footballer who plays for Loughgall as a striker.

Career
After signing his first professional contract at the end of the 2009-10 season, Douglas made his debut for Preston North End on 1 January 2011, in a 1-2 loss against Derby County. In May 2012, Douglas was released from the club after being told his contract would not be renewed. Later that month, he signed with Dungannon Swifts.

He signed for Loughgall in 2017, and for Portadown in January 2018. On 26 December 2018 he scored 2 goals for Portadown against former club Loughall.

He returned to Loughgall in May 2019.

Career statistics

References

1992 births
Living people
Association footballers from Northern Ireland
Preston North End F.C. players
Dungannon Swifts F.C. players
PLayers
English Football League players
NIFL Premiership players
Association football forwards